Johan Deysel (born 26 September 1991) is a Namibian professional rugby union player for  in the Pro D2 in France. His regular position is centre.

Deysel represented  since 2013 and represented them in the 2015 Rugby World Cup, where he scored his nation's first try of the tournament against .

Rugby career

Early life

Deysel was born in Windhoek, Namibia. At high school level, he represented Namibia at South African youth weeks, playing at the 2008 Under-18 Academy Week held in George and at the 2009 Under-18 Craven Week held in East London.

After high school, he moved to South Africa to enroll at the Potchefstroom Campus of the North-West University. He joined the Potchefstroom-based  rugby union and represented them in the Under-21 Provincial Championship in 2011 and 2012, as well as playing for university side  in the Varsity Cup competition.

Leopards

He again came on as a replacement in their match against the  a week later and scored his first senior try in that match, scoring in the 48th minute of a 71–10 victory.

Deysel made his debut in the second tier of the Currie Cup competition later in the same year. Despite only coming on eight minutes after half-time, Deysel managed to score two tries to help the Leopards to a 54–32 victory over the team from the Western Cape. He also started their semi-final match – facing the Falcons for the second week in a row – but could not prevent his side losing 24–31 to be eliminated from the competition.

He also scored a try against the UFS Shimlas in the final, but it proved futile as the team from Bloemfontein won 63–33 to be crowned Varsity Cup champions. In 2016, his try in the final was named the 2015 Try of the Year in the South African Rugby Union's annual awards.

After the Varsity Cup, Deysel made two appearances for the Leopards in the 2015 Vodacom Cup competition, before starting three matches for them in the 2015 Currie Cup qualification series. The Leopards finished second in the qualification series to progress to the Currie Cup First Division, a competition they eventually won.

At the end of 2015, he was included in the  training squad that prepared for the 2016 Super Rugby season.

Namibia

He made a further eight appearances before being named in Namibia's squad for the 2015 Rugby World Cup.

Colomiers
On 11 September 2018, Deysel would head to France to sign for Colomiers in the Pro D2 competition from the 2018-19 season. On 24 December 2020, Deysel signed a two-year contract extension to stay at Colomiers until the end of the 2022-23 season.

References

1991 births
Living people
Leopards (rugby union) players
Namibia international rugby union players
Namibian rugby union players
North-West University alumni
People educated at Windhoek High School
Rugby union centres
Rugby union players from Windhoek
White Namibian people